Paramulciber flavosignatus is a species of beetle in the family Cerambycidae, and the only species in the genus Paramulciber. It was described by Breuning in 1939.

It's 17.5 mm long and 5.25 mm wide, and its type locality is Mt. Matang, Borneo.

References

Homonoeini
Beetles described in 1939
Taxa named by Stephan von Breuning (entomologist)